Asparagus aphyllus is a species of plants in the family Asparagaceae. They are climbing plants. Flowers are visited by the Western honey bee, Syritta pipiens, Phthiria, and Halictus.

References 

aphyllus
Flora of Malta